Costasensora is a monotypic moth genus of the family Erebidae. Its only species, Costasensora honeyi, is known from Borneo. Both the genus and the species were first described by Michael Fibiger in 2010.

The wingspan is about 11 mm. The head, patagia, anterior part of the tegulae, prothorax, basal part of the costa, costal part of the medial area and the terminal area, including the fringes are black. the costal medial area is quadrangular. The forewing ground colour is whitish yellow. The crosslines are untraceable, except for the terminal line, which is marked by black interneural dots. The hindwing is grey, with an indistinct discal spot. The underside of the forewing is grey brown, while the underside of the hindwing is grey, with a discal spot.

References

Micronoctuini
Noctuoidea genera
Monotypic moth genera